Winnie Nantongo (born 27 October 1998) is a Ugandan technology journalist, author, and poet whose poetry is frequently shared through social media channels. Her poetry is known for being "short" and "incredibly touching", incorporating concepts of love, betrayal, healing, growth, and identity.

Personal life 
Winnie began writing at the age of eleven in her primary six. However, she started her social media presence back in 2012 on Facebook.

Career 

In March 2021, Winnie self-published her first poetry collection The Lover and Her Human on Amazon then later other online distribution platforms. Her work slowly became recognized to the public on social media by different celebrities, publications and Instagram poetry accounts.

She got elected to serve on the committee of Top Bloggers Uganda, an association uniting Uganda's top digital specialists in August 2021.

In July 2022, Winnie started her journalism career as a tech reporter for PC Tech Magazine.

References

External links 

 
 

1998 births
Living people
Ugandan women writers
 Ugandan women poets
Ugandan poets